The Helpmann Award for Best Male Actor in a Musical is a musical award, presented by Live Performance Australia (LPA) at the annual Helpmann Awards since 2001.  This is a list of winners and nominations for the Helpmann Award for Best Male Actor in a Musical.

Winners and nominees

Source:

2000s

2010s

See also
Helpmann Awards

Notes

A: In Little Me, Mitchell Butel plays all the men in the life of character Belle Poitrine, including: Noble Eggleston, Mr. Pinchley, Benny and Bernie Buchsbaum, Val du Val, Fred Poitrine, Otto Schnitzler, Mr. Worst and Prince Cherney.

References

External links
The official Helpmann Awards website

M